The 1944 Auckland Rugby League season was its 36th. The Auckland Rugby League allowed the Point Chevalier club to enter the first grade competition which meant that it was an even ten teams. There was no reserve grade competition as the war affected adult playing numbers once more. Several former senior players were killed along with others who had played or been involved in Auckland rugby league.

The City Rovers won the Fox Memorial first grade championship for the 8th time in their history, however it was their first championship for 19 years after last winning it in 1925. Their titles prior to 1944 were in 1910, 1911, 1916, 1921, 1922, 1923, and 1925. City also won the Rukutai Shield for being in the lead at the conclusion of the first round of the championship. It looked as though their season might be derailed at the halfway point when they protested the suspension of Eugene Donovan who was sent off in a match against Richmond for back chatting experienced referee G. Kelly. City refused to play their round 12 and round 13 matches and lost by default as a result. The league then informed them that they were disqualified from the championship and would be awarded no further competition points regardless of their results according to rules laid out in their constitution regarding successive unfulfilled fixtures. They had a change of mind however and allowed them to compete for the championship. City won their last 5 matches to force a playoff for the championship with Mount Albert United who were level with them on 26 competition points. City won the match 17 to 7 to claim the title.

Ponsonby United won the Roope Rooster knockout trophy for the 6th time when they beat North Shore Albions in the final 19-13 on October 14. Both teams had had disappointing Fox Memorial seasons but Ponsonby had steadily improved in the second half of the competition, particularly after their coach, Arthur Kay came out of retirement to take the playing field.

City won their third trophy of the season when they defeated Ponsonby 15-11 in the Stormont Shield champion of champions match on October 21 to conclude the season. The Phelan Shield was not competed for owing to the length of the season.

Once again the representative season was relatively short, in part due to the length of the club season, but also because there were restrictions on war time travel, especially by rail. Teams needed to be given government permits to travel and the West Coast was unable to obtain one of these for an intended visit to Carlaw Park, and Wellington had the same issue. Auckland beat South Auckland (Waikato) 36 to 5 at Carlaw Park, however a weakened Auckland side with 4 clubs playing in Roope Rooster matches in the same day lost the return match in Huntly 12-10. Auckland Māori defeated Auckland Pākehā 18 to 13 in what had become an annual fixture at Carlaw Park on September 9. The North Island – South Island fixture was played for the first time since 1939 season before a crowd of 16,000 with the North Island winning 43 to 15 with 10 of the 13 North Island players from Auckland.

Annual General Meeting 
Prior to the annual meeting the 34th annual report was released. It stated that "from a financial point of view the league is making steady progress. The total assets are £10,785, from which must be deducted liabilities amounting to £1,519. Assets show and increase of £42, and liabilities a decrease of £416. The surplus for the season was £223". There had been an increase of £4320 in revenue due to better attendance at matches at Carlaw Park, and also through hiring the park out during the off-season to sports such as baseball. They had collected gate receipts of £3,972 from club games and the three representative matches "which compared very favourably with the best seasons". 
 
The annual meeting was held on Tuesday, March 28 in the League Rooms on Courthouse Lane at 7.30pm. At the meeting chairman Mr. J.W. Watson said "we are providing football for 1300 players every Saturday". He went on to say that the schoolboys' organisation had a very successful season with 30 teams in the competition. The organisation had "done splendid work for the boys. They had decided to set up a board of control to govern schoolboy football, which would be similar to the junior board of control". He went on to say that "there were 10 junior teams, with about 600 players. He urged the senior clubs to take a greater interest in the juniors. In the senior grade they had nine teams, with about 150 players. The large number of players in the game showed... how wide flung the activities of the Rugby League were". He also paid tribute to the work of the referees and believed that "after the was there would be a great swing to sport of all kinds. At present there were just enough playing grounds, and he considered the local bodies should provide more grounds for the future". Mr. Dickson made reference to the illness of the president and former chairman Mr. G. Grey Campbell, "and a unanimous vote of sympathy was passed, with wishes for a speedy recovery". 
 
The following officers were elected: Patron, Mr. J.B. Donald; vice patron, Mr. J.F.W. Dickson; president Mr. George Grey Campbell; vice presidents, Sir Ernest Davis, Messrs J. Donald, C. Drysdale, H. Grange, R.J. Laird, W.J. Lovett, MP Frederick William (Bill) Schramm, W. Wallace, J.L. Coakley, T.G. Symonds, G.T. Wright, R.H. Wood, H. Walmsley, Joe Sayegh, Richard (Dick) H. Benson, Allan J Moody, H.W. Gray, B Brigham, N. Kyle, L.H. Heard, F.J. Osborne, J.R. Simpson, R. Newport, Joseph Patrick Moodabe; trustees Messrs J.W. Watson, Edward John (Ted) Phelan, A. Stormont; chairman Mr. J.W. Watson; deputy-chairman, Mr. Edward John Phelan; auditors, Messrs Garrard and Bennett; honorary solicitor, Mr. H.M. Rogerson; delegate to New Zealand Rugby League, Mr. R. Doble; club delegates to board of control Messrs Jim Clark, T. Davis, W.J. Probert and D. Wilkie; honorary secretary Mr. Ivan Culpan; honorary treasurer Mr. R. Doble. In October Mr. T. Davis resigned from his position on the board of control. Mr. F.T. McAneny was appointed in his position for the remainder of the season.

Senior competition 
Ten teams were nominated for the senior Fox Memorial championship: Manukau, Richmond, Ponsonby, Newton, Marist, City, North Shore, Otahuhu, Mt Albert, and Point Chevalier. All of these teams had taken part in the previous season with the exception of Point Chevalier who had applied to join. The Auckland Rugby League at their board of control meeting on March 28 decided to ask the club to send two officials to the next board meeting to give information as to the playing strength of the team. The application of Point Chevalier was accepted to participate in the preliminary round which would begin on April 15. They were to play the curtain raiser to the principal match on the main field at Carlaw Park against Otahuhu. As there would now be 5 senior matches per round one would need to be played away from Carlaw Park each week and in the first round of preliminary games the Richmond match with Marist was scheduled for Grey Lynn Park. 
 
At the May 10 meeting of the board of control it was recommended by the Senior Club Officers Association that during the 1944 season senior clubs should be allowed to play first juniors (second grade players) as seniors and vice versa without the requirement for them to be regraded. The recommendation was accepted. At the May 24 meeting it was suggested by the Referees Association that teams in the early games at Carlaw Park remain on the field at halftime and not retire to the dressing rooms. The reason was that the games were late to kick off in the second half. The request was declined with Mr. R. Doble stating that this procedure had been attempted years ago and was not a success then. It was decided to enforce the rule about getting players out in time.

With there being ten teams and five matches in each round it meant that one match would have to be played away from Carlaw Park each weekend. The grounds used were Devonport Domain (5), Grey Lynn Park (4),  Walker Park in Point Chevalier (4),  Fowlds Park in Morningside (3), Sturges Park in Otahuhu (1), Ellerslie Domain (1), and Onehunga School (1).
 
At the June 21 meeting of the board it was suggested that the second round of the competition be split into two as some teams were well out of contention already, Pt Chevalier had 1 win and 7 losses while Newton had lost all 8 of their matches. Mr. R. Doble said "that a keen second round was assured, but there were some teams hopelessly out of the competition". Mr. J. Clark suggested that the senior officers' association should be consulted before any change was made and it was decided to defer any decision until after the final matches in the first round were played. 

Horace Hunt, the North Shore captain was awarded a gold medal donated by Mr. J.F.W. Dickson for the most sportsmanlike players. Hunt had been connected to the North Shore club since 1926 when he was in his teens. He captained the North Shore reserve grade side when they won the inaugural reserve grade championship in 1931. He began playing in their senior side in 1932 when they won the championship. He had retired in 1939 and played a season of soccer before returning to the North Shore league side which had been depleted by the war effort. When Verdun Scott left for the war in 1941 Hunt took over the captaincy and North Shore won the championship for the 6th time. He also played cricket for the R.V. club in the city and Suburban senior competition and had represented Auckland in the Plunket Shield as wicket keeper four times in 1930 and 1931. 

At the board of control meeting on October 11 a letter "was received from the Point Chevalier club in reference to an increase in the transfer club fee from £2 to £10. It was decided that the time was not opportune to amend the existing regulations".

Protest defaults of City Rovers
In their round 12 win over Richmond the City side had Eugene Donovan ordered off the field for insulting the referee. Eugene was the brother of fellow City player Alan Donovan and senior referee Jack Donovan. They had a fourth brother who was killed in the war. The Auckland Rugby League decided to force Donovan to apologise to the referee to avoid suspension and after he failed to do this he was unable to play. The City club decided to default their match against Manukau despite efforts still being made at 2pm on match day to solve the issue. They were due to play the feature game on the number 1 field at 3.10pm. The City club supplied the Auckland Star with the following statement "in the game between Richmond and City, played at Carlaw Park on Saturday, July 8, Eugene Donovan, of city, was ordered off for alleged back-answering to the referee, Mr. G. Kelly, ten minutes after the commencement of the game. The City five-eight, Salaia, had just scored a try, and E. Donovan was retiring back to the halfway line, along with A. Leatherbarrow, when he passed a remark to his team mate. ‘If city's tries are not clear cut this chap won't allow them'. "The referee overheard the remark, and said ‘any more of that and you will go off'. Donovan replied that he was talking to his team mate, and the referee said that he did not care who he was talking to. "E. Donovan then replied that he would talk to his team mate anytime he wanted to. The referee then ordered him off. "These remarks can be corroborated by other City players. After the match the referee and Donovan were ordered to appear before the judicial committee or the control board, when conflicting evidence of the two men concerned was given, at the conclusion of which Donovan was ordered to apologise. This he refused to do as he claimed that he had told the truth and to apologise would be a confession of guilt. He then left the room. "Questioned by the City club officials, E. Donovan declared that he had told the truth and that he would rather hang up his boots than apologise for an offence he had not committed. A special meeting of the senior team and club officials was called before the game (Manukau and City last Saturday). It was unanimously resolved that the club endorse the attitude of E. Donovan". It was also noted later that referee G. Kelly had not asked for an apology. City then defaulted for a second consecutive Saturday when they refused to play their match against Marist on July 22 at Carlaw Park. Following round 13 the suspension of Donovan was lifted however as the City club had defaulted on two successive Saturdays, under the league constitution were disqualified from the championship. The controversy rolled on however as the city club found out after Watson's statement after their meeting to the press that they would receive no competition points for any of their remaining matches. And they also disagreed with the implication that Donovan had apologised to the referee. "This is contrary to fact and cannot be substantiated". It was then announced on August 12 that City would in fact be allowed to accrue competition points over the remainder of the season.

Fostering of junior grades
In October at the board of control meeting various speakers strongly urged the need to stimulate junior football in Auckland. Chairman Watson said "clubs which do not make an effort to foster junior football are doomed to extinction". He went on to add that "the real work of the league clubs was to foster juniors, and pointed to clubs like Richmond. Otahuhu, and Mount Albert, now strong numerically and financially. The Point Chevalier Club was coming to the front through its encouragement of junior football". The chairman of the Schoolboys' Control Board, Mr. Maurice Wetherill said that "the board had functioned well, and its members were keen to help school league football. It was felt that they did not get the publicity that they should. They were up against stronger opposition than any other branch of the league code. An effort to interest headmasters of schools had, up to a point, been successful. At the Mount Albert school the code had received splendid support, and there they had had use of what was regarded as the best all-weather ground in Auckland". Mr. H. Howe, the deputy-chairman of the Junior Control Board, said "they had had the best season for years, and in the third and fourth grades there had been brilliant football. If the senior teams gave more attention to the juniors there would be no necessity to look for players from the rugby union. Ivan Sumich was an example of a young player who had risen from the league juniors". Mr. L. Rout, secretary of the Schoolboys' control Board said there was a wonderful opportunity for league football in New Zealand… in Auckland they had gone a log way with schoolboy football, but they would have to go further. He hoped to see the code taken up by all the schools, and would like to see it carried into the secondary schools. The success of Sumich had been mentioned, but there were dozens of others, and one could point to Ron McGregor, of the Richmond club. Fifty percent of the senior players came from the schoolboy ranks.

Carlaw Park 
During the annual meeting in March, chairman Watson said that "during the off-season the management committee and trustees had decided to make improvement to Carlaw Park and, once building restrictions were eased, it was proposed to cover, in portions, the terraces on the main ground. The erection of specially-designed gates at the entrance to the park in the form of a war memorial was also intended". 
 At the June 7 board meeting it was decided to provide a permanent place in the grandstand for any disabled soldiers. At the July 5 meeting chairman Watson said that "despite bad weather there has been a considerable increase in the gate takings at Carlaw Park this season", and added that it had been the biggest revenue for the past four seasons.

Availability of grounds 
At the board of control meeting on May 17 the issue of ground availability was raised. Chairman Watson said "that for years the increasing shortage of playing grounds in the different suburbs had been pointed out, and the difficulty was being faced by all codes". He went on to refer to "the number of playing grounds lost through being taken over by the Armed Forces".

All Golds Old Boys Association Sunday matches 
During the season the All Golds Old Boys Association organised matches on Sundays at Walker Park in Point Chevalier. They had initially established themselves as the New Zealand Rugby League Old Boys Association before changing their name due to not having any official affiliation with New Zealand Rugby League. The matches attracted very large crowds ranging from 2 to 4,000 and featured players who had played on Saturday or rugby players which caused considerable concern for Auckland Rugby which sought to ban any of their registered players for taking part. Auckland Council had given permission for the matches and provided extra tramcars to meet the demand. On the morning of July 14 Auckland Rugby League chairman Watson released a statement saying "the organisation carrying on Sunday football at Walker Park is not connected with the Auckland Rugby League". And continued "it should be understood that the league is not in favour of organised Sunday football and considers that the competition at present being played on Sundays is not in the best interests of the game. We feel that there is room in Auckland for only one competition, and that should be the one conducted by the official body". The Auckland Council then prohibited the playing of football at Walker Park, Point Chevalier on Sundays after passing a resolution on July 14. Protests had been received from two churches (Point Chevalier Presbyterian Church and Point Chevalier Baptist Church) and five residents in the vicinity of the park. The Auckland Transport Board had also asked the council for their attitude on the games. Their regular services had become so overcrowded taking spectators to the matches that ordinary passengers were unable to ride. The council decided to inform the New Zealand All Golds Old Boys Association Social Club that "the holding of organised football on Walker Park on Sundays constituted an entertainment for which the consent of the council was required under section 313 of the Municipal Corporations Act.

Representative team 
At the May 17 board of control meeting the appointments were made for the three Auckland selectors for the representative season. They were R. Doble, Jim Clark, and Jack Kirwan. It was originally intended to play a match against South Auckland (Waikato) in early June however advice was received from Huntly that the government had asked the miners to work on Monday, June 5 which was King's Birthday, and it "was considered the match should be postponed until a later date". Auckland received requests for matches at Carlaw Park by South Auckland, West Coast, and Wellington. However Auckland had difficulty in scheduling the matches due to war time travel restrictions with permission needing to be obtained from the government. In late June the league received advice that railway travel permits were not going to be granted for the West Coast team. The West Coast union decided to apply for permission again at a later date. 
 
Jim Clark was appointed the manager of the side prior to their first match with South Auckland.

Obituaries

Donald McFarlane McKenzie 

On 24 February it was reported that Sergeant Donald McFarlane McKenzie "has now been reported lost at sea". McKenzie had been on an enemy ship (Nino Bixio) in the Mediterranean when it was torpedoed on August 17, 1942 while it was transporting prisoners to Italy from North Africa. He had entered the army in October 1940 and departed New Zealand in September 1941 as part of an early reinforcement draft, seeing service in the desert campaigns. McKenzie has been educated at Te Puke High School before later moving to Auckland where he played for the Newton Rangers first grade side. From 1938 to 1940 McKenzie scored 9 tries and kicked 2 conversions and 2 drop goals in first grade matches. He was aged 26 at the time of his death and survived by his wife Elsie Edith McKenzie, and his parents James and Mary McKenzie. McKenzie is memorialised at the Alamein Memorial in the El Alamein War Cemetery in Egypt, on the Roll of Honour at Greyfriars Presbyterian Church on Mt Eden Road, Auckland, and at the Auckland War Memorial Museum, WW2 Hall of Memories.

Rauaroa Tangaroapeau (Bill) Turei
Rauaroa Tangaroapeau Turei, better known as Bill Turei was a winger and full back who played for City Rovers from 1932 to 1935. He died of natural causes on April 15, 1944 while in Italy. He was a staff sergeant in the 2nd Māori Battalion and had enlisted in 1941 and went overseas with a reinforcement draft in May, 1943. Turei was educated at Auckland Boys Grammar and Te Aute College. In 1933 he represented Auckland in 4 matches, scoring 5 tries and kicking a conversion. In his debut match against Taranaki on June 10, 1933 he scored 3 tries in a 32-20 win at Carlaw Park. He played against South Auckland on July 15, before scoring 2 tries and kicking a conversion in a match with Taranaki at Western Park in New Plymouth. His final match was against North Auckland on August 12 where he played in the centres alongside Bert Cooke. For City he scored 24 tries, and kicked 12 goals for 96 points. He was the equal leading try scorer in the 1933 season and second in 1934. He was 37 at the time of his death and buried at the Salerno War Cemetery in Italy. At the time of his enlistment he had been living in Ponsonby in Auckland. Turei was survived by his wife, Maud Kathleen Turei.

William Edward Leo (Billy) Dervan 
On April 18 William Edward Leo (Billy) Dervan died at the age of 60 at his residence at 4 St. Stephen's Avenue, Parnell. He was Kiwi #72, representing New Zealand on their 1912 tour of Australia. Dervan was educated at the Marist Brothers' School in Pitt Street. He originally played rugby for Marist Brothers' Old Boys Club, then the City club before switching to rugby league in 1912 where he played in the forwards. He played 4 matches for Newton Rangers in the same season, scoring 5 tries and kicking 4 goals. He retired at the end of the season but served on the Newton committee in 1913. He was heavily involved in boxing and was the official announcer for the Auckland Boxing Association for over 20 years, and took an interest in several other sports such as swimming, wrestling, and cricket. Dervan also volunteered at the New Zealand Institute for the Blind where he "read to the inmates [and] kept them fully acquainted with topics of the day".

(George) G. Grey Campbell 
On April 23 Mr. (George) G. Grey Campbell passed away at Green Lane Hospital after a three month battle with illness aged 57. Campbell had been chairman of Auckland Rugby League from 1933 to 1942 and was president for the past two. He was born in Ponsonby on October 7, 1886, and was educated at Ponsonby and Parnell schools. After the First World War he entered a partnership with Mr. J. Victor Macky and established the accounting firm Macky and Campbell. Campbell became a member of the New Zealand Society of Accountants and was a past-president of the Public Accountant's Association. Campbell held several other prominent positions during his working life, and in 1929 was elected to the Auckland City Council, topping the poll for the 1931 elections. Some of the positions he held included being a board member of the Auckland Transport Board, the Auckland Urban Land Sales Committee, and the Auckland University College Council where he represented the government for 8 years.  Campbell was responsible after the outbreak of the war for organising many concert parties to military camps around Auckland through the Auckland Community Singing Committee. He also served on the Massey Agricultural College Council. At the time of his death he was also the vice-president of the Ponsonby Bowling Club. He was living at 38 Croydon Road, Mount Eden and was survived by his wife Elsie Ada and two daughters, Gwenyth and Elizabeth. His funeral was at the Beresford Street Congregational Church, where he was the superintendent of the Sunday school for many years, on April 25 at 2pm. He was buried at Hillsborough Cemetery, Auckland.

Trevor Clifford Hosken 
Trevor Clifford Hosken of Wiri, Manurewa was killed in action on April 22, 1944, in Iceland, Atlantic Ocean aged 23. His rank was Warrant Officer, in the Royal New Zealand Air Force, 1407 Meteorological Flight, RAF. He trained at the RCAF, 2 Wireless School in Calgary, Alberta, Canada and the RCAF, 3 Bombing and Gunnery School, MadDonald, Manitoba. He was educated at the Point Chevalier and Manurewa schools. Hosken played for the Papakura seniors from 1939 to 1941 scoring 8 tries and kicking a conversion. He had debuted at the young age of 18. He joined the R.N.Z.A.F in January 1941 and left for Canada in September of the same year. Hosken was survived by his parents as their only son, Joseph Thomas Hosken, and Gladys Florence Louise Hosken (nee Wilson) of Auckland. Hosken was buried at Reykjavik (Fossvogur) Cemetery, Iceland. He is memorialised at the Auckland War Memorial Museum, WW2 Hall of Memories.

Thomas Edwin Avery 
Thomas Edwin Avery died on June 13 aged 60. Avery was born on July 11, 1883. He had played for the City Rovers club from 1910 to 1915 scoring 2 tries. He also made 4 appearances for Auckland from 1910 to 1913. His debut appearance was against Whanganui on September 22 in a 15-14 win at Cooks Garden, while he also played in Auckland's 24-13 win over Nelson at Trafalgar Park in Nelson. He played again against the Combined Goldfields and Thames side in Thames on May 18, 1912 before his final representative match was in an exhibition match for Auckland against the North Shore side on August 16, 1913 at Pukekohe. After retirement he spent time on the City Rovers committee and later became a referee. In 1919 the Maritime Club which he had joined post war as a player nominated him to receive the New Zealand Rugby League's medallion of life membership which was approved. The Auckland Rugby League paid their respects to him at their board meeting on June 14 and sent a letter of condolence to his family.

Fox Memorial Shield (senior grade championship)

Preliminary rounds

Round 1

Newton Rangers were being coached by Puti Tipene Watene. Moana Herewini was the coach of the Point Chevalier side. There was some controversy as W.L. Werohia played for Manukau despite having signed on from the South Auckland league with the Newton club. He appeared before the board of control midweek stating that he had thought that his uncle Pita Ririnui would be playing with Newton and later found out that he would play with Manukau, and he wished to now play there instead. He was later given permission to play for Manukau. There was no individual scoring reported from the match at Grey Lynn Park between Richmond and Marist.

Round 2
Before the matches at Carlaw Park the teams stood in silence to remember former Kiwi and Newton Rangers player Billy Dervan who had passed away.

Fox Memorial standings

Fox Memorial results

Round 1
Prior to the commencement of the main matches all 4 teams lined up and stood in silence for one minute after Mr. J.W. Watson "referred feelingly to the recent death of Mr. G. Grey Campbell", the former chairman and president of Auckland Rugby League who had passed away recently. Point Chevalier played in their first ever match in the first grade competition and were easily defeated by Richmond 45-14. Their first try scorer was Croad while Dormer kicked their first points. The games were played in heavy rain which made the grounds also heavy, while Grey Lynn was muddy for the match between Marist and Newton. McLeod was carried off the field near the end of the match with a knee injury. Hooker, Owen Hughes played for Otahuhu as player/coach after transferring from City.

Round 2
North Shore were playing their 400th first grade match when they took on Ponsonby at the Devonport Domain though it is unlikely they were aware of this fact. They became the fourth club to achieve this feat behind fellow foundation clubs City Rovers, Ponsonby, and Newton. After they lost to Ponsonby 8-0 their all time record to this point was played 400, won 206, drawn 26, lost 168. J Matthews returned from the Middle East where he had been serving in the armed forces and played for City. He scored a "spectacular try" in their win over Richmond. Bert Leatherbarrow was also now playing for City. Travers Hardwick scored his first ever try for Ponsonby. Future All Black, Johnny Simpson scored a hat trick of tries in Marist's win over Point Chevalier. His brother, Ivan had scored for Marist the previous week.

Round 3
Oswald Lawrence Martin broke his leg while playing for Manukau against City at Carlaw Park in the main match. He was taken to Auckland Hospital as was Allan Thomas Vost who was concussed in the match at Walker Park between North Shore and Point Chevalier. Vost was playing for the North Shore side.

Round 4
The match between Mount Albert and Point Chevalier was played on Mount Alberts home ground of Fowlds Park in Morningside. When they scored their last points of the match they passed the 2000 point mark in the first grade competition. They became the 8th club to achieve the feat.

Round 5
James Chalmers, the former Marist senior player was in attendance at Carlaw Park. He had fought in the war and had a leg amputated as a result of injuries he received. He "was given a fine welcome by the patrons". Don Mullett, the New Zealand Heavyweight boxing champion made his first appearance for the Ponsonby side and caused quite a bit of interest.

Round 6
The round 6 matches were played in rain on heavy fields.

Round 7

Round 8
Point Chevalier recorded their first ever win in the Fox Memorial first grade competition when they defeated Newton 9-7 on Carlaw Park #2 field in the early kickoff. O Elliott of Newton had to leave the field in the first half with an ankle injury. Richmond played in their 300th first grade match against Otahuhu though it is unlikely they were aware of this fact. Following their win they had an all time record of 300 played, 143 wins, 10 draws, and 147 losses. The match between Marist and North Shore was played at the Ellerslie Domain. The Ellerslie League Football Club was given permission by the Ellerslie Domain Board to "demand a fee for admission to the domain, not in any case to exceed 6d per person". In a refereeing milestone, G Kelly refereed in approximately his 100th match involving first grade sides becoming the 4th referee to achieve this feat after Les Bull, Percy Rogers, and S Billman.

Round 9

S Billman refereed his 135th match involving first grade sides in Auckland club football which was more than any other referee had done when he officiated in the Otahuhu v City match. He had been a referee for 19 years and in the senior grade for 10. At the end of the season the Auckland Star wrote an article on Billman after he had been elected honorary secretary of the Auckland Centre of the New Zealand Amateur Athletic Association. Otahuhu caused a shock when they defeated the leaders City 15-10 in the main match on the number 1 field. Aubrey Thompson had transferred from Manukau to Richmond and scored a try in their loss to Mount Albert.

Round 10
Flags were flown at half mast after the death in a mining accident in Huntly of New Zealand international George Beadle.

Round 11
Former New Zealand international Arthur Kay came out of retirement to re-join his Ponsonby side. He kicked a conversion in their 11-4 win over North Shore. N. Finlayson was ordered off for Manukau in their match with Otahuhu but they still won 5-4. Eugene Donovan was ordered off for City in their 13-12 loss to Richmond. The send off happened early in the match due to remarks he made to the referee, G. Kelly. There were rumours in the following Saturday's newspapers that they may not take the field in protest at the send off and they ultimately turned out to be true.

Round 12
City refused to play their match with Manukau in protest at the punishment imposed on Eugene Donovan who had been sent off the week prior. The Auckland Rugby League had said that unless he apologised to the referee (G. Kelly) he would remain suspended. As he had not apologised he was unable to play. As a result the Mount Albert – Marist match which was scheduled for the number 2 field was moved to the main field with a 3:10 kickoff. H Tate refereed his 50th match involving first grade teams becoming the 12th referee to achieve this feat.

Round 13
City once again defaulted their match as Auckland Rugby League still required Eugene Donovan to apologise to the referee and an apology was not forthcoming, City arguing that Donovan's version of events differed from those given by the referee and also that the referee (Kelly) did not ask for an apology.

Round 14
Harold Milliken, former All Black turned out for the first time for Mount Albert in their match with North Shore which was drawn 10-10. He had switched codes in 1940 when he joined the Papakura senior side. The suspension of Eugene Donovan was lifted by the Auckland Rugby League, but ironically their opponent, Newton, defaulted the match which was due to be played at Walker Park. Newton was still winless to this point in the season.

Round 15
There was no individual scoring reported from the match at Fowlds Park in Morningside where Manukau beat Newton 29 to 10.

Round 16
Going into this round, with 3 remaining the top of the table was extremely competitive with teams on 22, 20, 20, 20, 18, and 18 competition points. Crucially Manukau, who had been in first place lost to Marist, while near rivals Mount Albert and City both won levelling all 3 teams on 22 points. Otahuhu who had been on 20 competition points faltered with a loss also. There was no individual scoring reported in the match at the Devonport Domain between North Shore and Richmond.

Round 17
During the week the league expressed their sympathy to the family of W.J. Gibbons who had died. He had been a former time keeper for games. N Johnson of Otahuhu was ordered off in their match with City. The match between Manukau and Point Chevalier was played at Onehunga School which was the first time a senior first grade match had been played at a school.

Round 18
With City and Mount Albert both winning and Manukau losing it meant that the two former teams were tied on 26 competition points with Manukau dropping into third. With the round robin completed it meant that City and Mount Albert had to play off for the Fox Memorial title for 1944. Richmond scored their 4,000 first grade point in their 26-9 win over Otahuhu. There was no mention of any score from the Point Chevalier match against Newton at Walker Park in Point Chevalier. With both teams at the foot of the table it is possible that the match was not played. Referee Jack Hawkes officiated in his 50th match involving first grade sides, becoming the 13th Auckland referee to do so up until this point.

Championship final
Following the final round of the championship the league decided to play the final 3 weeks later due to representative fixtures being played prior. This led to a protest letter from the Mount Albert club who felt the gap was too long and that the final should have "priority over other fixtures". Future New Zealand representative Warwick Clarke was ruled out for city due to injury. A Jones, the Mount Albert five eighth was also said to be unavailable due to injury but ultimately did play and scored a try for the losing Mount Albert side. City proved too strong winning 17-7 to claim their first title since 1925.

Roope Rooster

Round 1

Round 2

Semi finals
Ponsonby fielded Gordon Littlejohn who had been a long time Manukau rugby player and represented Auckland in 1943. Brian Nordgren also debuted for them after switching codes. In 1945 he would score over 200 points for Ponsonby and was signed by Wigan, where he played for over a decade. Late in the match Mount Albert's Richard Shadbolt was sent off for fighting. It was the fourth time that he had been sent off in senior rugby league. He had been cautioned three times already and had "a final serious talking to" before the final incident. The league decided to "severely warn" him.

Roope Rooster final
Playing for Ponsonby were Darcy Bailey, a former Canterbury rugby representative and J.W. Priest, a former Taranaki rugby representative. For North Shore, A.L. Read, a former Poverty Bay rugby player also played. North Shore led 10-3 at halftime before a big comeback by Ponsonby which won the second half 16 to 3 to claim their 6th Roope Rooster title 19 points to 13.

Stormont Shield final
City's win was their first ever Stormont Shield title since its inception in 1925.

Top try scorers and point scorers
The try and point scoring lists were compiled from Fox Memorial, Roope Rooster, Phelan Shield, and Stormont Shield matches. Ron McGregor was in his second season for Richmond and led all try scorers with 14. B Lowther of Richmond was the leading try scorer with 14, with Bruce Graham and Roy Nurse scoring 12 each. Basil Cranch (Mt Albert) finished with the most points once again with 92. C Riley of Otahuhu scored 80 and was also awarded a medal for being a top goal kicker. Prolific scorer Alan Donovan finished third with 76. There were however 2 matches that received no reported individual scoring. They were the match between Richmond and North Shore, won by Richmond 8-5 and Manukau's 29-10 win over Newton.

Top try scorers

Top point scorers

Lower grades
Despite no coverage of lower grade competitions the Ellerslie United club advertised the opponents and venue of their lower grade sides throughout the season and so the following lists of teams in those particular grades have been compiled. On October 21 Newton beat Point Chevalier 28-8 to win the third grade knockout competition. On the same day the Point Chevalier senior schoolboy side won the seven-a-side knockout competition which was at Carlaw Park. They were awarded a Bantam Rooster which had been taxidermied and was donated by C.P. Moore. It was mounted on a stand holding wooden footballs and the idea for it had come from the Roope Rooster competition. Eight teams were involved with the players weighing less than 5st 7lb. The fourth grade knockout final was won by Otahuhu when they defeated Ellerslie 15-8.

Senior B
Unknown if there was a senior B grade.

Second grade
Unknown

Third grade
Ellerslie, Glenora, Green Lane, Mount Albert, Newton, Otahuhu, Point Chevalier, Ponsonby

Fourth grade
City, Ellerslie, Green Lane, Mount Albert, Newton, Otahuhu, Papakura

Fifth grade
Unknown

Sixth grade
Ellerslie, Green Lane, Newton, Point Chevalier, Richmond

Seventh grade
Green Lane, Marist

Schoolboys

Junior
Ellerslie, Green Lane, Mount Albert, Otahuhu, Richmond

Intermediate
Ellerslie, Green Lane, Marist, Mount Albert, Northcote

Seniors
Ellerslie, Green Lane, Marist, Otahuhu, Richmond

Representative season
 Auckland played 2 matches against South Auckland. Ralph Martin (Manukau), Ron McGregor (Richmond), F James (City), and Don McLeod (Marist) were the only players to play in both matches. It was planned during the season to play the West Coast and Wellington representative sides but they were unable to gather permits to travel on the railways in war time conditions. Auckland Pākehā and Auckland Māori played each other once again in a fixture that had become regular since 1936 when larger numbers of Māori players began playing in Auckland, thanks in particular to the Manukau club which recruited many Māori players from out of Auckland. Auckland Māori won which meant they had now won 6 of the matches, with Auckland Pākehā winning 4, and 2 draws. The other representative fixture played in Auckland was the North Island v South Island match which had not been played since 1939 due to the outbreak of war and difficulty of travel. Ten of the 13 North Island players were from Auckland.

Representative matches

Auckland v South Auckland (Waikato)

Auckland Māori v Auckland Pākehā

North Island v South Island
This was the first time since 1939 that the North Island v South Island match had been played. The North Island won comfortably scoring 9 tries to 3. The North Island side featured 10 players from the Auckland competition (Ralph Martin, Roy Nurse, Ron McGregor, Robert Salaia, Jim Murray, Dick Hull, T Rutherford, Pita Ririnui, F James, and A Rogers). Hawea Mataira had originally been selected but was travelling to Wellington with the Auckland Waterside Workers team to play in their annual fixture with Wellington Waterside and was replaced by Ririnui. Owen Brooks of Waikato had a field day, scoring 3 tries and kicking 8 conversions from 9 attempts.

South Auckland (Waikato) v Auckland
Auckland fielded a slightly weaker side as North Shore, Newton, Ponsonby, and Mount Albert were all playing in the Roope Rooster semi finals so their players were unavailable for selection.

Auckland matches played and scorers

Auckland Māori (Tāmaki) matches played and scorers

Auckland Pākehā matches played and scorers

Fourth Grade representative side
On July 26 the following fourth grade representative side was selected to play the South Auckland fourth grade representatives at Carlaw Park on August 5:- W. Harris, A. Speedy, W. Wright, Streeton, Philp (Otahuhu), Gwilliam, D. Shaw (Newton), P. Roberts, D Greacen, F. Chapman, G. Chapman (Ellerslie), G. Clark, L. Cook, Donnelley (Papakura), Anderson, and Somers (Point Chevalier).

Club news

Auckland Rugby League Junior Control Board 
They held their annual meeting in the League Rooms, Courthouse Lane on Tuesday, April 4 at 8pm. Their honorary secretary was W.F. Clarke.

Auckland Rugby League School Control Board 
The School Control Board held their annual meeting on Monday, March 27 at 7.30pm at the League Rooms, Courthouse Lane. Their honorary secretary was L. Rout. It was reported that Thomas Briton Carey was killed in action on August 20, 1944. He was aged just 22. He had served for ten months with the New Zealand Expeditionary force in the Pacific. He then returned to New Zealand and transferred to the Air Force. Carey joined the 35th (mixed) Battalion in the Second Expeditionary Force. He was on a flight returning from Fiji to New Zealand which was lost, missing at sea. Carey had been educated in Auckland and was a rugby league player, representing Auckland schoolboy representatives many times as their captain. He is memorialised at the Bourail Memorial, Bourail New Zealand War Cemetery, New Caledonia.

Auckland Rugby League Referees Association 
On April 27 Mr. Alfred Ernest Jaggs of Clarement Street, off Khyber Parr Road died at the age of 68. He was a football player who after retiring from playing refereed rugby union and rugby league. He refereed 3 first grade games in the 1911 and 1912 seasons and the representative match between Auckland and Hawke's Bay on 19 August, 1911. He was buried at Waikumete Cemetery. The following were appointed as officers on the school control board: chairman, Maurice Wetherill; secretary-chairman, Mr. V. Rose; secretary, Mr. L. Rout; board members, Messrs, J. Silva, W. Moore, J. Hanlon. E. Te Bhurt, A. Lennie, referees' delegate, Mr. J. Cottingham.

Avondale League Football Club 
Avondale League Football Club held their annual meeting on April 27 in the Labour Party Rooms on Georges Road, Avondale at 8pm. Their honorary secretary was H.W. Green. On August 19 the Priaulx family (parents Alfred Mansell Priaulx and Lydia Priaulx) thanked the Avondale rugby league club for their messages of sympathy after the loss of their only son (Roy Leslie Priaulx) who was killed in action in the war. Roy died on July 26, 1944, in Italy. He was buried at Florence War Cemetery, Italy. He is memorialised at the Auckland War Memorial Museum in the World War 2 Hall of Memories.

City Rovers 
City Rovers advertised for a practice for "all players and intending players, seniors, 3rd and 4th grades" for Saturday, March 25. Their honorary secretary was E.A. Girven. Their chairman was George Hunt. During their round 11 match with Richmond, Eugene Donovan was sent off for referee abuse and ordered to apologise to the referee. He failed to do so and was suspended as a result. The City club protested by refusing to play their match with Manukau the following week.

Ellerslie United 
The Ellerslie United Rugby League Club held their annual meeting at the Parish Hall on Monday 13 March at 7.30pm. Their honorary secretary was G. Whaley. They held a practice at the Ellerslie Reserve on Good Friday, April 7 for all grades. The Auckland Rugby League decided at the May 31 meeting to hold a senior match at Ellerslie on June 17 at the Ellerslie Domain which is the present day ground of the Ellerslie Eagles.

Glenora Rugby League Club 
On March 16 it was reported in the New Zealand Herald that Norman William Wilson was lost at sea on 17 August, 1942. He had been a prisoner of war and was being transported on the Nino Bixio ship which was taking prisoners from North Africa to Italy when it was torpedoed. He had been part of the 2nd N.Z.E.F. and in the Infantry Brigade at the time of his capture. Wilson was the son of Charles Wilson and Mary Wilson (nee Jenkins) of 56 Methuen Road in Avondale. He had been educated at Glen Eden School and played rugby league for Glenora for a number of years. Wilson was a storeman and living in Henderson when he enlisted. He is memorialised at the Alamein Memorial, El Alamein War Cemetery in Egypt, the Oratia District School War Memorial Gates on Shaw Road, and the Auckland War Memorial Museum, WW2 Hall of Memories. 
 
On March 31 Glenora Rugby League Football Club advertised for a training for all teams at the Glen Eden Football Grounds. Their secretary was G. Malam. At the May 31 meeting the Glenora club requested that a senior match be played in Glen Eden.

Green Lane Rugby League Football Club 
Green Lane Rugby League Club held their annual meetining at the Fire Brigade Hall on Wednesday, March 15 at 8pm. Their secretary was W. Leitch.

Manukau Rugby League Football Club 
Manukau Rugby League Football Club held their annual meeting on Thursday, March 2 at 7.45pm in the Labour Party's Rooms, by the Strand Theatre, Queen St., Onehunga. Their honorary secretary was H. De Wolfe. They held a meeting for players and intending players at Carlaw Park at 9.30am on Friday, April 7 for all grades. 

Manukau held a meeting on October 16 to discuss their upcoming trip to Tauranga.

Marist Brothers Old Boys 
The Marist Brothers Old Boys League Football Club held their annual meeting at the Rugby League Rooms on Courthouse Lane, on Tuesday, March 14. Their honorary secretary was Jack Kirwan. Marist held a meeting for all junior and schoolboy players at Vermont Street School on Tuesday, March 21 at 7.45pm.

Mount Albert Rugby League Club 
The Mount Albert Rugby League Social Club advertised a social event for February 19 at the St. George's Hall in Kingsland featuring modern and old time music, "Monte Carlo and Supper". Their honorary secretary was Mr. J. Wood. The Mount Albert Rugby League Football Club held their annual meeting at their club rooms at Fowlds Park in Morningside on Monday, March 13 at 8pm. Their honorary secretary was P.W. Clement. Mount Albert advertised for a practice for all grades at Fowlds Park on Saturday, March 25 at 2pm. They advertised for another practice for all grades on Saturday, April 1 at 2pm at "ground, Springleigh Avenue, off Woodward Road, Mount Albert. The Mount Albert Borough Council advised the league that use of the Phyllis Street Reserve had been granted to the Auckland Hockey Association. The Borough Council also referred to the provision of dressing accommodation at Fowlds Park and that a conference of all sports bodies would be held regarding the question.

Newton Rangers 
The Newton Rangers Rugby League Football Club held their annual meeting at the Auckland Rugby League rooms on Courthouse Lane, on Monday March 13 at 7.30pm. Their honorary secretary was J.A. MacKinnon. Newton advertised for a general practice of all grades at Carlaw Park on Saturday, April 1 at "2.30 pm. Sharp". And that weekly training would be on Tuesday and Thursday. In September it was reported that Harry Leonard Burton had won the Distinguished Flying Cross award for gallantry in action. He had played for the Newton seniors in 1940 and 1941. On December 13 the well known barrister, Mr. Jeremiah James Sullivan collapsed and died during a trial at the Auckland Supreme Court. He had previously represented the Newton club on the Auckland Rugby League.

North Shore Albions 
It was reported in the Auckland Star on March 7 that North Shore player Jack Smith (Charles Ernest Smith, though better known as Jack) had kicked a penalty goal in the Second N.Z.E.F. rugby teams win over the Rest of Egypt 9-7 in Alexandria. 
 
The North Shore club was granted permission to charge 1 shilling for each person attending the round 16 match at the Devonport Domain on August 19. All funds raised would be given to the Devonport 1944 Patriotic Funds.

Northcote and Birkenhead Ramblers Football Club
The Northcote club only fielded a single team in the intermediate schools competition.

Otahuhu Rovers Rugby League Club 
On February 29 the Auckland Star reported that Lance-Bombardier, Ernest Reginald Wilson had died on 9 February, 1944 from wounds while fighting in the Battle of Monte Cassino. He left New Zealand for service in 1941 with the second N.Z.E.F. and was with the 14 Light Anti Aircraft Regiment when killed. Wilson was the youngest son of Mrs. M.A. Wilson of 20 Symonds Street, Auckland and Mr. T. Wilson of Scotland. He had been educated at Epsom School and Seddon Memorial Technical College. Wilson was a member of the Otahuhu rugby league club and the Otahuhu baseball team and was a canister maker by trade. He was single when he enlisted and was survived by his mother Mary Alice Wilson, originally of Cessnock, New South Wales, Australia but living at 20 Symonds Street at the time of his death. Wilson was aged 24 when killed and was buried at Cassino War Cemetery, Italy. He is memorialised at the Auckland War Memorial Museum, WW2 Hall of Memories.
 
Otahuhu Rovers Rugby League Club held their annual general meeting at their club rooms on Fairburn Road in Ōtāhuhu on March 13 at 7.30pm. Their honorary secretary was M. Ritchie.  At the first board of control meeting for the year it was decided to play Otahuhu's second preliminary match at Sturges Park in Otahuhu to raise money for "patriotic purposes". At the board meeting on June 7 a letter was received from the Otahuhu club "stating it felt that the time had come when they should make an effort to obtain a fair share of Sturges Park in Ōtāhuhu. It was felt that an inquiry coming from the ruling body would carry more weight than a request from the club. It was the intention, in the event of having the use of the park, to apply for a senior match, or matches, to be played there later in the season. It was decided to take the matter up with the Ōtāhuhu Borough Council". The Otahuhu Borough council wrote a letter stating that Sturges Park was let for the duration of the war to the Auckland Rugby Union. On June 22 the control board gave Otahuhu permission to send a team of schoolboys to Christchurch in August provided "satisfactory travel arrangements were made".

Papakura Rugby League Football Club 
The Papakura Rugby League Football Club held their annual general meeting on Monday, March 13 at 8pm in the Papakura Scout Hut. Mr. A. L. Lewis was their honorary secretary. In early December Papakura held a function in the club rooms on Union Street. The president, Mr. Les McVeigh presided over the large attendance. He mentioned that the club was now in its fourteenth year of playing football and that they had "provided no less than 80 members for the forces".

Pt. Chevalier Rugby League Football Club 
Point Chevalier Rugby League Football Club held their annual meeting will be held in the Social and Sports Club Hall at 417 Pt Chevalier Road on Monday 20 March at 7.30pm. Their honorary secretary was A.G. Daniels.

Ponsonby United Rugby League Club 
Ponsonby United Rugby League Club held their annual meeting at the Leys Institute on February 28 at 7.30pm. Their honorary secretary was Mr. J. Davidson. They advertised a practice for all grades to be held at Grey Lynn Park on Sunday, March 12 at 9am. They also requested that "men who are prepared to coach any grade are invited along". Ponsonby was given permission to travel to Bennydale in the King Country to play a game on October 28. In October it was reported that Pilot Officer William Thomas (aged 20) had won his commission in Canada. He was a member of the Ponsonby senior side and had left New Zealand last February.

Richmond Rovers 
It was reported in the Auckland Star on 18 February that Sergeant Mervyn Jack Jarvis was reportedly killed in action. He had enlisted in 1940 and trained in Australia before travelling to the Middle East. He served in the Eight Army and had been wounded in 1942. His death occurred on December 2, 1943, whilst he was part of the 24 Infantry Battalion. Jarvis attended Seddon Memorial Technical College and was a playing member of the Richmond club. He had transferred from the Marist sixth grade B team to Richmond 2nd grade in 1936. He played for the Richmond reserve grade side in 1939 and 1940. He was survived by his parents Mr Stephen Frederick Jarvis and Mrs Agnes Dorothy Jarvis who he had been living with at 27 Moa Road, Point Chevalier, along with brothers Ken and Richard. Mervyn was 28 at the time of his death and buried at the Sangro River War Cemetery in Italy. Ken and another brother, Les, were also fighting and their mother, Agnes was involved in the effort at home. He is remembered in the Auckland War Memorial Museum's Hall of Memories. His parents and brothers wrote memoriam notes which were published in the Auckland Star the following year.

Richmond Rovers Football Club advertised for a "general practice" to be held at Grey Lynn Park on Saturday, March 25. Their honorary secretary was W.R. Dick. The senior side was captained by Leo Davis.

Transfers and registrations 
At 3 May board of control meeting the following transfer of players to senior clubs was approved; J. Matthews (Marist to City), I. Te Weti (City to Marist), Robert Grotte (City to Ponsonby), R. Humphries (Avondale 4th grade to North Shore), W.C.S. Miller (Mt Albert to Pt. Chevalier), A. Potter (Newton to Pt. Chevalier). The South Auckland Rugby League notified that the following players had been transferred to Auckland Rugby League; W.L. Werohia, N. Dowling, and T. Shaw. Richmond requested that Owen Payne he regraded from senior to first junior as, despite playing several senior games the previous season he only weighed 9 stone 4 pounds and had no intention of playing senior grade this season. W. Woods of City was also regraded to first junior. 
 
At the May 10 meeting E. Neale of the Richmond senior team was graded to first junior. The following transfers were approved:- R. Hodge (Manukau seniors), W. Bridger, O.C. Elliott (Newton seniors), J. Mills (Otahuhu seniors). 
 
At the May 17 meeting the following players were registered:- F.S. Wells (Point Chevalier), T.J. Keri (Newton), W. Bidois (Newton), J.J. Fogarty (Otahuhu), M.H. Middleton (Otahuhu), and J.W.R. Mitchell (Point Chevalier). 
 
 
At the May 24 meeting the following transfers were approved:- G Carey (Richmond to Mount Albert seniors), J Sullivan (Ponsonby to Newton seniors), D.A. Hutchinson (City to Newton seniors), G. Montgomery (Mount Albert 3rd grade to Point Chevalier seniors). The following players were registered:- J.J.H. Harding (Point Chevalier), T.H. Wakefield (City), C.H. Blincoe (Point Chevalier), R.G. Kidd (Marist), G.G. Smith (Marist), A.S. Byers (Point Chevalier). 
 
At the May 31 board meeting the following players were granted transfers:- Ernie Pinches (Mount Albert to Richmond seniors), Cyril Henry Bloomfield Wiberg (Marist to Mount Albert seniors), C.S. Clarke (Marist to Mount Albert seniors), J.F. Scarlett (Richmond to Manukau seniors), R.C. Martin (Otahuhu to Manukau seniors). The following players were registered:- Ernie Pinches (Richmond), G. Davidson (Newton), J. Hapeta (Newton), P.W. Caddick (North Shore), and C.S. Clarke (Mount Albert). 
 
The June 7 board meeting saw the following players registered :- R. Towgood (Pt Chevalier), F.W. Goffin (Point Chevalier), and Reg. E. Martin (Manukau). 
 
At the June 14 meeting H.R. Gee was granted a transfer from Mount Albert to City. While G. Cunningham was registered with City seniors and W.A.J. Grove with Point Chevalier seniors. 
 
On June 21 C.S. Clarke was granted a transfer from Mount Albert to City, T. Waihi from Ponsonby to Newton, G. Te Haara from city to Newton, and T. Tonga from Ngaruawahia to Manukau. The following players were registered:- D.H. Hardwick (Ponsonby), C.J. Honey (Ponsonby), B. Gallagher (Newton), G.C. Sorby (Newton), F.J. Pritchard (North Shore), and J.C. Gurnick (Newton). 

On June 28 Aubrey Thompson of Manukau was granted a transfer to the Richmond club. The following players were registered:- W. Rogers (Manukau), H. Cassidy (Newton). 

On July 5 W.F. Bicknell was registered with Point Chevalier, and J.H. Catterall was also registered with Point Chevalier.

On July 12 H Brady was cleared to play for Otahuhu after previously having played for Newton. C. Cowley was granted a transfer from Mount Albert to Richmond, and L. Pinfold from Richmond to Mount Albert.

On July 26 I. Te Weri asked for a transfer from Marist to Mount Albert as he had not been selected for 5 weeks and desired to play for a club in a lower position.

At the August 16 meeting John Anderson was granted a transfer from Marist to Point Chevalier, although he requested to be transferred back around the same time and was granted a transfer at the beginning of the 1944 season. Anderson was a New Zealand representative and one of the most prolific point scorers in Auckland club rugby league history. W. Briggs was also granted a transfer from Ponsonby to Newton. The following players were registered:- K.H. May (North Shore), A. Puriri (Manukau), R. Neil (Newton), J. Porter (Newton), G. Parahi (Manukau).

At the August 23 meeting D. Muru's registration with Newton was approved, as was A.J. Hogan's with Point Chevalier, and G.A. Woolley's with Newton. 

On August 30 P.A. Maconaghie was registered with North Shore, F. Cocks with Ponsonby, T. Pokawa with Manukau, and M.C. Smith with Newton.

On September 6 D. Walker was granted a transfer from Richmond to Point Chevalier. D. Tate was registered with North Shore. 

On September 27 the following transfers were approved:- W.G. Simpson from City to Otahuhu, and W.G. Davidson from Newton to Marist. The following were registered:- G.J. Blake (Point Chevalier), A.L. Read (North Shore), C. Lane (Mount Albert), G. Mitchell (Newton), H.J. Walker (North Shore), and J.W. Priest (North Shore). 

On October 14 the following player was registered:- H. Borich with Mount Albert. The application of John Anderson from Pt. Chevalier to Marist, and Leo R. Davis from Richmond to Mount Albert were deferred until next season.

References

External links 
 Auckland Rugby League Official Site 
 
Auckland Rugby League seasons 
Rugby league in Auckland 
Rugby league governing bodies in New Zealand  
Rugby league